Mark Landon Smith (born January 29, 1964) is an American playwright and actor. Known as a comedy writer, with ten scripts published by Baker's Plays/Samuel French, and Steele Spring Publishing, Drama Source and Contemporary Drama Service and includes three foreign translations, an Off-Broadway production, a film adaptation and numerous productions throughout the world annually.

As actor he has appeared on stage, film and television.  Film credits include Gordon Family Tree, Valley Inn, Mayfly, Neapolitan, Frog's Hair, Greater and Crossfire.  He served a producer for the films Dupont, Mississippi and The Man in the Trunk.

He is the executive director of ARTS LIVE THEATRE, Co-founder/Co-Producer of Ceramic Cow Productions and co-director, emcee and actor with Phunbags Comedy Improv.  He is also the Founder and co-director of the Actor's Casting Agency.

Smith has appeared in regional theatres receiving nominations and wins for Best Actor, Best Supporting Actor, Best Featured Actor, Best Set Design and Best Choreography.  His script Christmas Carol High School'''' is a 2012 AATE Distinguished Play Award nominee.

Plays
 Faith County (1991)
 Faith County 2 (1993)
 The Really Hip Adventures of Go-Go Girl (1995)
 A Dickens of a Christmas Carol (1996)
 Hindenberg, Das Explosive New Musical (1997)
 Radio TBS (1998)
 Dupont, Mississippi (2000)
 The Pirate Show (2007)
 Christmas Carol High School (2010)
 Teenagers From Outer Space (2011)
 Plan 9 From Outer Space (2013)
 Brawl at the Ball (2013)
 Night of the Living Dead'' (2014)

References

External links
 celebsandfans.comozarksunbound.combooks.google.com
 bakersplays.com
 
 
 https://web.archive.org/web/20120613083104/https://www.contemporarydrama.com/default.aspx Samuel French Catalog of Published Plays
 doollee.com

Living people
American male actors
1964 births
American male screenwriters